Mirage was recorded as an album by Eric Burdon and The Eric Burdon Band in 1973 during the "Mirage Project". It was not released until 27 February 2008 by Universal.

Four "Mirage" sessions were released as a bootleg.

On 27 February 2008 Universal and Polydor released 9 Eric Burdon albums, some re-issues, some unreleased tracks.

Mirage was scheduled to release by Atlantic on June 1974. It never did. In 2006 AIM released a compilation Wild & Wicked which features some tracks of the Mirage project and the later "Comeback project".

The album was also about Vietnam War.

The United Artists film Mirage was never made.

Track listing
All tracks composed by Eric Burdon; except where indicated
 "Dragon Lady"
 "Jim Crow" (Aalon Butler)
 "Mind Arc"
 "Ghetto Child"
 "River of Blood"
 "Driftin'/Geronimo's Last Stand"
 "Highway Mover"
 "Cum"
 "First Sight"
 "Mirage" (Jimi Hendrix)
 "Stole My Heart Away (First Sight)"

The title song "Mirage" was written by Jimi Hendrix in the night he died. It was called "The Story of Jesus". Because it wasn't released for a long time, Burdon re-recorded it for the 2000 Hendrix tribute CD Blue Haze under the name Third Stone from the Sun/The Story of Life.

N.B. On the CD cover, the "Ghetto Child" and the "Mind Arc" are mentioned as 3rd and 4th respectively, which is wrong.

Personnel
Eric Burdon - vocals
Aalon Butler, Snuffy Walden - guitars
Randy Rice - bass guitar
Alvin Taylor - drums, percussion

Eric Burdon albums
2008 albums